Debra H. Rodman (born 1972) is a former member of the Virginia House of Delegates. She was first elected in 2017, and represented the 73rd district comprising parts of Henrico County. Rodman is a member of the Democratic Party.

Personal life and career

Debra Rodman was raised in Coral Gables, Florida. Rodman is an associate professor at Randolph-Macon College, teaching anthropology and women's studies. She travels to Guatemala yearly, where she researches the effects of migration on that country. Rodman also serves as an expert witness for asylum seekers.

Political career
In 2017, Rodman ran for the Virginia House of Delegates for the 73rd district, then held by Republican incumbent John O'Bannon. Rodman defeated three other candidates in a caucus on April 29, 2017 to win the Democratic nomination. In the general election, Rodman defeated O'Bannon by a 3% margin.
She raised $373,000 over the course of the campaign, outraised by O'Bannon by nearly $200,000.
In 2019, Rodman challenged incumbent Sen. Siobhan Dunnavant for the Senate of Virginia's 12th District seat. Rodman narrowly lost the election to Dunnavant on November 5, 2019.

Electoral history

Legislative issues
Rodman ran on and helped pass Medicaid Expansion, which gives health care access to over 400,000 Virginians. She also refuses to take money from Dominion Power or Appalachian Energy.

In the 2019 legislative session, Rodman was the chief sponsor for bills to expand LGBTQ equality, voting rights, and increase the tipped minimum wage.

Rodman was on the Education Committee, Health, Welfare and Institutions Committee, and Agriculture, Chesapeake and Natural Resources Committee.

References

External links
Debra Rodman at the Virginia Public Access Project

1972 births
Living people
People from Henrico County, Virginia
Democratic Party members of the Virginia House of Delegates
Women state legislators in Virginia
21st-century American politicians
Randolph–Macon College faculty
University of Miami alumni
University of Florida alumni
21st-century American women politicians
American women academics